The Ian Dempsey Breakfast Show is an Irish breakfast radio show broadcast on weekday mornings from 06:00 – 09:00 on Today FM. Presented by Ian Dempsey, it is noted for its Gift Grub feature, performed by Mario Rosenstock. It is the tenth most popular radio programme in Ireland and was named best breakfast programme at the 2007 PPI Radio Awards.

Dempsey won a Meteor Award for Best Radio DJ at the 2003 Meteor Awards and has been nominated on a regular basis ever since, most recently in 2008. The show has also had a number of renowned producers including Adelle McDonnell and Alison Curtis, who resigned from the post after being given her own weekday radio show on the station in 2008.

Another notable former producer of the show is Paul McLoone, a fellow Today FM radio presenter and current frontman of the Northern Irish pop-punk band, The Undertones and who also helped co-create the highly popular and successful comedy series, Gift Grub alongside Rosenstock.

In 2008, The Ian Dempsey Breakfast Show'''s listenership figures were reduced by 4,000 to 234,000.

HistoryThe Ian Dempsey Breakfast Show has been on air since September 1998 and originally broadcast until 10:00 but an extra hour was given to The Ray D'Arcy Show'' in 2004 to allow direct competition with RTÉ 2fm rival Gerry Ryan. Each year for that time period, i.e. ten years, Dempsey and the breakfast crew have gone skiing. In 2007, the show replaced Eamon Dunphy's RTÉ Radio 1 Sunday morning programme as the 10th most listened to programme in Ireland. Lucy Kennedy presented the show when Dempsey was absent on 18 July 2008.

In 2011, Sinéad O'Connor announced her fourth marriage live on the show.

Features
"Talking Heads" features a number of voices played in quick sequence. Listeners are allowed to guess the voices to win a cash prize. "Free For All Friday" occurs each Friday when the listeners may request which songs are played on the show.

References

External links
 Webpage of The Ian Dempsey Breakfast Show on TodayFM.com

 
1998 radio programme debuts
Irish breakfast radio shows
Today FM programmes